Gëzim Shalaj (born 28 July 1990) is a Swiss footballer of Albanian descent who plays as a midfielder for Swiss 1. Liga club FC Naters.

He began his career with Swiss lower league side Düdingen, before winning a move to Swiss Challenge League club Kriens in 2010. After just over two seasons with Kriens, he joined Swiss Super League side Luzern, but played just once in the top-flight, in March 2012, before returning to the Challenge League to play for Lugano later in 2012. After two seasons with Lugano, he joined Romanian Liga I side Pandurii Târgu Jiu for the 2014–15 campaign. He signed with Dinamo București in October 2015, but left the club after just two months. He spent the second half of the 2015–16 season with Cypriot First Division club Enosis Neon Paralimni. He signed with English League One side Port Vale in August 2016. He signed with Trepça'89 in the Superleague of Kosovo in January 2018, before returning to Switzerland the following year to play for Breitenrain Bern and Naters.

Career

Switzerland
Shalaj was born in Switzerland and is of Albanian descent. He spent a brief time in the youth team at Dynamo Dresden in 2008. He began his senior career at Düdingen, scoring two goals in 14 1. Liga (third tier) appearances in the first half of the 2009–10 campaign. He moved on to Swiss Challenge League (second tier) side Kriens for the second half of the 2009–10 season. He made his debut for Kriens on 7 March, coming on as a half-time substitute for Thierry Stadelmann in a 0–0 draw with Lausanne-Sport at the Stade olympique de la Pontaise. He scored his first goal for the club on 15 May, in a 6–2 win over Locarno at Stadion Kleinfeld. He went on to become a first team regular in the 2010–11 season, missing just one league game, though 11 of his league appearances were as a substitute. He began the 2011–12 season with three goals in 14 games, before he was signed to Swiss Super League side Luzern by manager Murat Yakin.

However, he struggled with injuries and played just one top-flight game for the "Luminaries", coming on as a half-time substitute for Nelson Ferreira in a 2–1 defeat by Servette at Stade de Genève on 11 March 2012. He returned to the Challenge League for the 2012–13 campaign, joining Lugano. He scored four goals in 20 matches as Lugano finished seventh in the 2012–13 season, and then scored one in 27 appearances in the 2013–14 campaign as the club posted a second-place finish, nine points behind promoted champions Vaduz. He received the first red card of his career on 14 May 2014, in a 3–0 win over Locarno at Stadio del Lido. Both he and teammate Jonathan Sabbatini were contacted by betting fraudsters who wanted to rig a match, but Shalaj and Sabbatini reported the incident to the Swiss Football Association.

Romania
Shalaj signed a one-year contract, with the option for two more seasons, at Romanian Liga I side Pandurii Târgu Jiu in July 2014. He picked up a toe injury in December, which kept him out of action for a month. He ended the 2014–15 campaign with three goals and made six assists in 33 league and cup appearances, including one goal in a 3–1 win over champions Steaua București at the Stadionul Municipal on 15 March. The goal against Steaua București saw him named on the Liga I team of the week, alongside his midfield teammates Mihai Pintilii, Mihai Roman, and Dan Nistor. He played three matches of the club's run to the 2015 Cupa Ligii Final, including a substitute appearance against Dinamo București in the first leg of the semi-final.

He joined Dinamo București in October 2015. He played 169 minutes across seven games before he had his contract cancelled by mutual agreement in December 2015.

Enosis Neon Paralimni
Shalaj moved to Cyprus to play for Cypriot First Division club Enosis Neon Paralimni in February 2016. He scored on his debut on 6 February, in a 2–0 victory over AEL Limassol at Tsirion Stadium. The club were relegated at the end of the 2015–16 season.

Port Vale
In August 2016, Shalaj signed a one-year contract with EFL League One club Port Vale. Manager Bruno Ribeiro said that Shalaj was "very strong for English football" but would need time to build his fitness as he missed out on pre-season training.

Later career
On 8 January 2018, Shalaj joined the defending Superleague of Kosovo champions Trepça'89. He returned to his native country to sign for Swiss Promotion League side Breitenrain Bern at the end of the 2018–19 season. Ahead of the 2019–20 season, Shalaj joined Swiss 1. Liga side FC Naters.

Style of play
Speaking in July 2012, Luzern manager Murat Yakin described Shalaj as "very fast" with a "strong left foot". Speaking in September 2016, Shalaj said that "I am left-footed, I play on the wing and I like to cross, I like to go one against one and get balls into the striker".

Career statistics

References

External links

Profile at Swiss Football League

1990 births
Living people
Footballers from Bern
Swiss people of Albanian descent
Swiss men's footballers
Association football wingers
Dynamo Dresden players
SC Kriens players
FC Luzern players
FC Lugano players
CS Pandurii Târgu Jiu players
FC Dinamo București players
Enosis Neon Paralimni FC players
Port Vale F.C. players
KF Trepça'89 players
Breitenrain Bern players
FC Naters players
Liga I players
Swiss Challenge League players
Swiss Super League players
Swiss Promotion League players
Cypriot First Division players
English Football League players
Football Superleague of Kosovo players
Swiss expatriate footballers
Expatriate footballers in Germany
Swiss expatriate sportspeople in Germany
Expatriate footballers in Romania
Swiss expatriate sportspeople in Romania
Expatriate footballers in Cyprus
Swiss expatriate sportspeople in Cyprus
Expatriate footballers in England
Swiss expatriate sportspeople in England
Expatriate footballers in Kosovo
Swiss expatriate sportspeople in Kosovo